Livin' Inside Your Love is the seventeenth album by jazz guitarist George Benson which was released in 1979. In the United States, it was certified Gold by the RIAA.

Track listing

Side A
 "Livin' Inside Your Love" (Earl Klugh) – 6:37
 "Hey Girl" (Gerry Goffin, Carole King) – 4:31
 "Nassau Day" (Ronnie Foster)  – 6:14

Side B
 "Soulful Strut" (Eugene Record, Sonny Sanders) – 5:37
 "Prelude to Fall" (Ronnie Foster) – 6:30
 "A Change Is Gonna Come" (Sam Cooke) – 3:47

Side C
 "Love Ballad" (Skip Scarborough) – 5:15
 "You're Never Too Far From Me" (George Benson) – 6:43
 "Love is a Hurtin' Thing" (Ben Raleigh, Dave Linden) – 4:25

Side D
 "Welcome Into My World"  (George Benson) – 4:08
 "Before You Go" (George Benson) – 6:27
 "Unchained Melody" (Alex North, Hy Zaret)  – 6:36

Personnel 
 George Benson – guitar, vocals 
 Jorge Dalto – acoustic piano, clavinet, Wurlitzer electric piano, Fender Rhodes, acoustic piano solo (9)
 Ronnie Foster – Fender Rhodes, Yamaha CS30, Minimoog, Polymoog, acoustic piano solo (3, 5), Fender Rhodes solo (10, 11), Minimoog solo (11)
 Greg Phillinganes – Fender Rhodes (2)
 Phil Upchurch – rhythm guitar
 Earl Klugh – acoustic guitar, classical guitar solo (1)
 Will Lee – bass guitar (1-4, 8, 9, 12)
 Robert Popwell – bass guitar (5, 6, 10)
 Stanley Banks – bass guitar (7, 11)
 Steve Gadd – drums
 Ralph MacDonald – percussion
 Mike Mainieri – orchestrations and conductor (1, 5, 7), vibraphone (5)
 Claus Ogerman – orchestrations  and conductor (24, 6, 8-12)

Production 
 Producer – Tommy LiPuma
 Recorded and Mixed by Al Schmitt 
 Assistant Engineers – Don Henderson and Michael O'Reilly
 Rhythm section recorded at Atlantic Studios (New York, NY).
 Strings recorded at Columbia 30th Street Studio (New York, NY) and Capitol Studios (Hollywood, CA).
 Mastered by Mike Reese at The Mastering Lab (Los Angeles, CA).
 Production Coordination – Jill Harris and Christine Martin
 Music Contractors – Frank DeCaro and Christine Martin
 Art Direction – John Cabalka
 Design – Brad Kanawyer
 Photography – Tom Bert
 Direction – Ken Fritz, Dennis Turner and Connie Pappas.

References

1979 albums
George Benson albums
Warner Records albums
Albums produced by Tommy LiPuma
Albums arranged by Claus Ogerman
Albums recorded at CBS 30th Street Studio
Albums recorded at Capitol Studios